Zouheir Dhaouadi (born 1 January 1988) is a Tunisian professional footballer who plays as a winger for Club Africain.

Career
Dhaouadi was born in Kairouan. He transferred in July 2006 from JS Kairouan to Club Africain, where he played until 2012. On 10 July 2012, Dhaouadi signed a three-year deal with Ligue 1 outfit Évian.

Dhaouadi has played for the Tunisia national team on 34 occasions, including four games in the 2010 Africa Cup of Nations.

Career statistics

Scores and results list Tunisia's goal tally first, score column indicates score after each Dhaouadi goal.

References

External links
 

1988 births
Living people
Tunisian footballers
Association football wingers
Tunisia international footballers
2010 Africa Cup of Nations players
2011 African Nations Championship players
2012 Africa Cup of Nations players
2013 Africa Cup of Nations players
Ligue 1 players
Tunisian Ligue Professionnelle 1 players
Saudi Professional League players
Club Africain players
Thonon Evian Grand Genève F.C. players
Al-Wehda Club (Mecca) players
Étoile Sportive du Sahel players
Tunisian expatriate footballers
Tunisian expatriate sportspeople in France
Expatriate footballers in France
Tunisian expatriate sportspeople in Saudi Arabia
Expatriate footballers in Saudi Arabia
Tunisia A' international footballers
People from Kairouan